Charles Morgan (7 February 1917 – 11 July 2001) was an English cricketer. Morgan was a right-handed batsman who bowled right-arm off break. He was born at Clay Cross, Derbyshire.

Morgan made a single first-class appearance for Nottinghamshire against Middlesex in the 1946 County Championship at Trent Bridge. Nottinghamshire won the toss and elected to bat first, making 263 all out, during which Morgan was dismissed for a duck by Laurie Gray. He bowled 22 wicketless overs in Middlesex's first-innings of 484 all out, while in Nottinghamshire's second-innings of 182 he was the last man out, dismissed for 13 runs by Walter Robins. Middlesex won what was to be his only major appearance by an innings and 39 runs.

He died in North Carolina, United States on 11 July 2001.

References

External links
Charles Morgan at ESPNcricinfo
Charles Morgan at CricketArchive

1917 births
2001 deaths
People from Clay Cross
Cricketers from Derbyshire
English cricketers
Nottinghamshire cricketers